Beta-Lactamase Inhibitor Proteins (BLIPs) are a family of proteins produced by bacterial species including Streptomyces. BLIP acts as a potent inhibitor of beta-lactamases such as TEM-1, which is the most widespread resistance enzyme to penicillin antibiotics. BLIP binds competitively the surface of TEM-1 and inserting residues into the active site to make direct contacts with catalytic residues. BLIP is able to inhibit a variety of class A beta-lactamases, possibly through flexibility of its two domains. The two tandemly repeated domains of BLIP have an α2-β4 structure, the β-hairpin loop from domain 1 inserting into the active site of beta-lactamase. BLIP shows no sequence similarity with BLIP-II, even though both bind to and inhibit TEM-1.

References

Protein families